María Josefa Acevedo Sánchez de Gómez (1803–1861), generally published under the name Josefa Acevedo or Josefa Acevedo de Gómez, was a Colombian poet and prose writer.

Biography

Early life 
Acevedo was born in Bogotá on 23 January 1803, to José Acevedo y Gómez and Catalina Sánchez de Tejada. She had two older siblings, José Pedro and Liboria, and six younger siblings, Eusebia, José Prudencio, Juan Miguel, Alfonso, Catarina, and Concepción.

Career 
Acevedo wrote formal verse, essays, and biographies of famous contemporaries and notable members of her family by blood or by marriage that were published and widely circulated during her lifetime.

The first of Acevedo's books to be published was a cross between a long-form essay and instruction manual on married life titled Ensayo sobre los deberes de los casados. Due to Acevedo's misgivings about the quality of her writing and her resulting fear that the book would be harshly judged, the earliest editions of the work were published anonymously. The book proved very popular, however, and years later, a fifth edition was released with authorial attribution.

Cuadros de la vida privada de algunos granadinos, a book collecting short stories by Acevedo with plots drawn from the author's own life and notorious contemporary events, was published posthumously.

Acevedo also wrote a stage play in two acts titled La coqueta burlada, a novel, an autobiography, and other papers that were never published, some of which were purportedly lost to fire.

Marriage and children 
Acevedo was married to lawyer and politician Diego Fernándo Gómez. Together, they had two daughters, Amalia and Rosa. Acevedo also adopted a son, Joaquín. Her children married and had children of their own, among them Colombian politician and poet Adolfo León Gómez.

Death 
In the final years of her life, Acevedo resided in her daughter Rosa's home in the countryside. She died there on 19 January 1861, and was buried in nearby Pasca, Cundinamarca.

Published works

Essays 
Tratado sobre economía doméstica para el uso de las madres de familia i de las amas de casa (1848, José A. Cualla)

Ensayo sobre los deberes de los casados (1857, F. Torres Amaya); earlier editions published anonymously

Biographies 
Biografía del General José Acevedo Tejada, with Alfonso Acevedo (1850, León Echeverría)

Biografía del doctor Diego Fernando Gómez (1854, F. Torres Amaya)

Recuerdos nacionales: José Acevedo y Gómez (1860, Pizano y Pérez)

Biografía de Vicente Azuero (n.d.)

Biografía de Luis Vargas Tejada (n.d.)

Poetry collections 
Oráculo de las flores y las frutas, acomodado a su lenguaje i con doce respuestas en verso (1856, F. Torres Amaya)

Poesías de una Granadina (1854, Anselmo León)

Short stories 
Cuadros de la vida privada de algunos granadinos (1861, El Mosaico)

Recognition 
Poems by Acevedo were included in Poetisas americanas, an 1896 anthology of verse by noted female poets of the Americas.

References 

People from Bogotá
1803 births
1861 deaths
19th-century Colombian women writers
Colombian women poets
19th-century poets
Colombian women essayists